Lev Matveyevich Vainshtein (also "Vaynshteyn" and "Lew Weinstein"; 12 March 1916 – 25 December 2004) was a Soviet world champion and Olympic bronze medalist in shooting.

Early life
Weinstein was born into a Jewish family from Yekaterinburg, Perm Governorate, Russian Empire.

Shooting career
Vainshtein was affiliated with the Dynamo St. Petersburg club in St. Petersburg.

He won a bronze medal in shooting  at the 1952 Olympics in Helsinki, in the free rifle 300 metre rifle three positions, as his teammate Anatoli Ivanovich Bogdanov won the gold medal, and Robert Bürchler of Switzerland won the silver medal.  He came in fifth in the men's 50 metre pistol (60 shots).

He also won a number of world, European, and USSR championships in his career.  He won gold medals as part of the Soviet Union team in both the 25 metre center-fire pistol and the 50 metre pistol in the 1954 World Championships in Caracas.  Four years later, he again won a gold medal with the Soviet team in the 50 metre pistol at the 1958 World Championships in Moscow, and was part of the Soviet silver medal-winning Soviet team in the 25 metre center-fire pistol.

Vainshtein coached the Soviet shooting team at the 1964 Olympics.

Publications
Sportskytte med pistol och revolver, Lew Weinstein, Svenska Sportskytteförbundet, 1961
Sportliches Schiessen mit Faustfeuerwaffen, Lew Weinstein, Dt. Schützenbund, 1979

See also
List of select Jewish shooters

References

1916 births
2004 deaths
Sportspeople from Yekaterinburg
People from Yekaterinburgsky Uyezd
Russian Jews
Soviet male sport shooters
ISSF pistol shooters
Shooters at the 1952 Summer Olympics
Olympic shooters of the Soviet Union
Olympic medalists in shooting
Russian male sport shooters
Jewish sport shooters
Soviet Jews
Olympic bronze medalists for the Soviet Union
Medalists at the 1952 Summer Olympics